Lilaki (also Romanized as Līlakī; also known as Lailaki, Loolaki, and Lūlakī) is a village in Shuil Rural District, Rahimabad District, Rudsar County, Gilan Province, Iran. At the 2006 census, its population was 10, in 4 families.

References 

Populated places in Rudsar County